Jean-Pierre Delphis (born 12 January 1969) is a former French racing cyclist. He rode in the 1993 Tour de France, finishing in 108th place.

References

1969 births
Living people
French male cyclists
People from Aix-les-Bains
Sportspeople from Savoie
Cyclists from Auvergne-Rhône-Alpes